The Eastern Orthodox Church in Kazakhstan is a metropolitan district or metropolia of the Russian Orthodox Church. Although not autonomous or fully self-governing like the Ukrainian Orthodox Church under the Moscow Patriarchate, the Church in Kazakhstan has been given some self-government, with jurisdiction over all Orthodox Christians in Kazakhstan. Most of its members are ethnic Russians, Ukrainians, Koreans, and Belarusians resident in Kazakhstan.

History

As in the rest of Central Asia, in ancient times there were communities of the Church of the East in what today is Kazakhstan. These communities were long extinct by the time the modern history of Orthodoxy started in Kazakhstan with the expansion of the Russian Empire into the region. In the mid-19th century the Russian Orthodox Holy Synod founded the Eparchy of Turkestan to care for all Orthodox Christians in Russian Central Asia, but this was later divided into smaller dioceses. In June 1945 the Russian Orthodox Church created the Eparchy of Almaty and Kazakhstan to care for Orthodox Christians in Kazakhstan.

Following the collapse of the USSR in 1991 the Russian Orthodox Church in Kazakhstan was reorganized into three eparchies - of Almaty and Semey, Shymkent and Akmola, and Oral and Guryevskiy. In 2003 these three eparchies were united as an ecclesiastical province, with the seat of the Almaty Eparchy being transferred to Astana (formerly Akmola) following its designation as the capital of Kazakhstan. In October 2010 three more eparchies - of Karaganda, Kostanay, and Pavlodar - were created in Kazakhstan and the Archbishop of Astana and Almaty was elevated to the rank of metropolitan archbishop with the title 'Metropolitan of Astana and Kazakhstan.'

In 2011 three more eparchies - of Kokshetau, Petropavl, and Oskemen - were founded. Although not autonomous or self-governing, the Orthodox Church in Kazakhstan has its own statute approved by the Russian Orthodox Holy Synod and is responsible for coordinating the educational programs, publishing work, social outreach, and missionary efforts of Orthodoxy in Kazakhstan.

Structure

The Orthodox Church in Kazakhstan is currently cared for by 9 eparchies or dioceses. They are:
 Eparchy of Astana and Almaty: City of Astana and Almaty Region
 Eparchy of Karaganda and Shakhtinsk: Karaganda Region
 Eparchy of Kokshetau and Akmola: Akmola Region
 Eparchy of Kostanay and Rudny: Kostanay Region
 Eparchy of Oral and Aktobe: Aktobe, Atyrau, Mangystau, and West Kazakhstan Regions
 Eparchy of Pavlodar and Ekibastuz: Pavlodar Region
 Eparchy of Petropavlovsk and Bulaevo: North Kazakhstan Region
 Eparchy of Shymkent and Taraz: Jambyl, Kyzylorda, and South Kazakhstan Regions
 Eparchy of Oskemen and Semey: East Kazakhstan Region

With the exception of the Eparchy of Astana and Almaty the eparchies are all contiguous territorially. The Eparchy of Astana and Almaty, however, covers two separate areas centered on the former and current capital cities of Kazakhstan.

Hierarchy

The Local Synod of the Orthodox Church in Kazakhstan consists of the nine diocesan bishops serving in the country as well as their vicar or auxiliary bishops. The Local Synod has competency over matters concerning Orthodoxy in Kazakhstan, but must have many of its decisions - such as the establishment of new dioceses - approved by the Holy Synod of the Russian Orthodox Church. As of January 2016 the members of the Local Synod are:
 Metropolitan Alexander (Mogilev) of Astana and Kazakhstan (2010–present)
 Archbishop Anthony (Moskalenko) of Oral and Aktobe (1991–present)
 Archbishop Eleutherius (Kozorez) of Shymkent and Taraz (1991–present)
 Bishop Anatolius (Aksenov) of Kostanay and Rudny (2010–present)
 Bishop Barnabas (Safonov) of Pavlodar and Ekibastuz (2010–present)
 Bishop Sebastian (Osokin) of Karaganda and Shakhtinsk (2011–present)
 Bishop Vladimir (Mikheykin) of Petropavl and Bulaevo (2014–present)
 Bishop Amphilochius (Bondarenko) of Oskemen and Semey (2012–present)
 Bishop Serapion (Kolosnitsin) of Kokshetau and Akmola (2013–present)
 Bishop Nectarius (Frolov) of Taldykorgan, Auxiliary of the Astana and Almaty Eparchy (2014–present)
 Bishop Gennadius (Gogolev) of Kaskelen, Auxiliary of the Astana and Almaty Eparchy (2010–present)

See also
 Christianity in Kazakhstan
 Russian Orthodox Church

Sources and external links
 Official Website of Orthodox Church in Kazakhstan
 Metropolitan District of the Russian Orthodox Church in the Republic of Kazakhstan (Website of the Moscow Patriarchate)
 Metropolita of Kazakhstan (OrthodoxWiki)